Mohammad AAM Khairuzzaman Mia is a Jatiya Party (Ershad) politician and the former Member of Parliament of Faridpur-2.

Career
Mia was elected to parliament from Faridpur-2 as a Jatiya Party candidate in 1986.

References

Jatiya Party politicians
Living people
3rd Jatiya Sangsad members
Year of birth missing (living people)